Jonathan Harden (born 1979) is an Irish actor and director.

Early life
Harden was born in Belfast in 1979, the son of an Irish father and American mother.

Career
Harden's most notable credits include the roles of Sean Rawlins in the crime drama series Unforgotten, Gregory in the final season of the comedy series Peep Show, Walter Hill in the costume drama series Titanic: Blood and Steel, Newman Noggs and the narrator in the BBC adaptation of Nicholas Nickleby, Brendan Murphy in Jimmy McGovern's 2021 prison drama Time, and an unnamed character in Star Wars: The Last Jedi.

Harden's stage credits include Henry Joy McCracken in Stewart Parker's Northern Star at the Finborough Theatre and Children of the Sun at the Royal National Theatre under the direction of the late Howard Davies. Of his performance in Northern Star, the Time Out review wrote, "Jonathan Harden reveals himself as an extraordinary talent whose performance leaves an afterglow like a good whiskey."

Harden provided the narration for 2015 BAFTA-winning short film Boogaloo and Graham. He has also provided voices for several video games, most notably as Xenophilius Lovegood in Harry Potter and the Deathly Hallows: Part I. In 2014, he played Axl in the Ridley Scott-produced Halo film Halo: Nightfall.

In 2015, Harden launched In Anything at the Minute? The Honest Actors' Podcast, a project centred on interviews with other jobbing actors and available on iTunes. In 2017, he produced and directed his first film project, Guard, a female-led boxing film set in Belfast. It had its debut at the Galway Film Fleadh in July 2017, and soon after had its North American premiere at the Rhode Island International Film Festival. In 2018, it was followed by Troubles, on the subject of male mental health, which again debuted at the Galway Film Fleadh.

Following his venture into film directing, Harden made his London stage directing debut in 2020, with Joe Crilly's On McQuillan's Hill at the Finborough Theatre. The production sold out and received critical acclaim, including five stars from the Morning Star and four stars from The Stage. Originally produced in 2000 at the Lyric Theatre, Belfast, the Finborough production was an English premiere and marked the 20th anniversary of the play's Belfast debut.

In 2021, Harden appeared in Jimmy McGovern's prison drama Time as lifer, Brendan Murphy. The role earned him praise from many, with Esquire calling this performance, "a highly-charged, emotive turn, and the Sunday Life noting it as "superb".

Personal life
Harden is a vegan and enjoys running. He is married to Northern Irish actress Bronágh Taggart.

Filmography

Film

Television

References

External links
 

1979 births
Living people
Alumni of Queen's University Belfast
Male actors from Belfast
Male film actors from Northern Ireland
Male television actors from Northern Ireland
Male stage actors from Northern Ireland
Male video game actors from Northern Ireland
Male voice actors from Northern Ireland
People from County Antrim
Film directors from Northern Ireland
Irish theatre directors
British theatre directors
Irish voice actors
People educated at Rathmore Grammar School